Maria Dorota Leopoldyna Czapska (6 February 1894 – 11 June 1981) was a Polish writer, essayist, and historian. She was born in Prague to Count Jerzy Hutten-Czapski (1861-1930), and Jozefina Thun-Hohenstein (1867-1903), and grew up in Przyłuki, the family estate near Minsk. Her younger brother was Józef Czapski, and her relatives included Counts Emeryk Hutten-Czapski, Emeryk August Hutten-Czapski, and Karol Hutten-Czapski.

Czapska studied in Krakow from 1921 to 1925, and moved to Paris afterwards, spending the next five years there writing a biography of Adam Mickiewicz. The biography, La vie de Mickiewicz, published in 1931, was used for a time as a source in establishing Mickiewicz's ethnicity and origin, which remains under speculation. In 1938 she published her second work, Ludwik Śniadecka, and received the literary prize "Wiadomości Literackich" for her efforts the following year.

During World War II, Czapska lived in Poland, and during this time was a member of The Council to Aid Jews, or  Żegota.  This led to her crossing the green border and moving to France in 1945, where she lived the rest of her life. For a short time, Czapska helped with the startup of Tygodnik Powszechny, and after moving to France she worked on Kultura, a Polish exile magazine. She was also a member of Polish Society of Arts and Sciences Abroad. During her time in exile, her works were subject to censorship, which was discovered after Tomasz Strzyżewski defected to Sweden, publishing the information which noted her name among many others. Later in life, she focused on literary works, namely Dwugłos wspomnień, Europa w rodzinie, and Czas odmieniony.  In 2014 two of her books, A Family of Central Europe and Through the Storm were published in one book for the first time in English.

Works
La vie de Mickiewicz, Paris, 1931
Ludwika Śniadecka, Kraków, 1938
Szkice mickiewiczowskie, London, 1963
Polacy w ZSRR (1939-1942) (antologia), Paris, 1963
Dwugłos wspomnień (pisane z bratem), London, 1965
Europa w rodzinie, Paris, 1970
Une Famille d´Europe Centrale, Paris, 1972
Czas odmieniony, Paris, 1978
Gwiazda Dawida, London, 1975
Ostatnie odwiedziny i inne szkice, Warsaw, 2006
Une Famille d´Europe Centrale, Paris, 2013
A Family of Central Europe and Through the Storm, Buenos Aires and Cracow, 2014

References

1894 births
1981 deaths
Polish essayists
Polish women essayists
20th-century Polish women writers
20th-century Polish historians
20th-century Polish non-fiction writers
Polish women historians
20th-century essayists
Żegota members
Expatriates from the Russian Empire in Austria-Hungary
Polish expatriates in France
People associated with the magazine "Kultura"